BRP Felix Apolinario (PC-395) is twenty-second and final ship of the  of the Philippine Navy. She was commissioned in 2000 and is currently in active service with the Littoral Combat Force, Philippine Fleet.

Namesake
Cmdre. Felix M. Apolinario, PN was born on 2 May 1918 in Santa Cruz, Manila. Poling earned the moniker “verbatim” during his senior year, because of his studiousness. After graduation, he joined the OSP, saw action in Bataan as ground support for the 1st Q-Boat Sqdn and beach defense in Lamao. After Bataan fell, he became a POW, was interned in Capas and released as a sick POW in August 1942. After the war he reported to military control and helped rebuild a new OSP that later became the Philippine Navy. He held various positions that culminated in his becoming FOIC, PN in 1965, a post he held up to his retirement in June 1966. After retirement, Poling established a company dealing with marine electronics, life saving equipment, airplane parts, firefighting and audio equipment. Poling was also a devoted golfer and played the game as a hobby for many years. He died in July 1999 at age 81.

History
In 1989, the Philippines placed an order of four fast patrol craft with Trinity-Equitable (formerly Halter-Marine Equitable) for $9,400,000US. The first of the four vessels, arrived on 20 August 1990, was named . The lead ship of the class was named after Jose Andrada, who was one of the original officers of the Offshore Patrol of the Philippine Commonwealth government. In April 1990, the Philippines ordered an additional ship and three more ships in August 1990. In March 1993, eleven more vessels were ordered. A total of 22 ships were acquired by the Philippine Navy by 1999.

Design
The ships of her class were built to the standards of the United States Coast Guard, with an aluminum hull and superstructure. In addition, a  rigid inflatable boat powered by a 40-hp outboard motor is stowed amidships. She has a complement of 12. The ship is equipped with a Raytheon AN/SPS-64(V)11 Navigation/Surface Search Radar, but with a smaller antenna as those used in bigger Philippine Navy ships. Like all other Philippine Navy ships, the entire class was installed with the Philippine Navy Vessel Tracking System (VTS) by the Naval Sea Systems Command.

Armament
The ships of her class are armed with one 25 mm Bushmaster chain gun on Mk.38 Mod.0 mount on second and later batches (PG-379 to PG-395), four M2HB Browning 12.7 mm/50 caliber machine guns on Mk.26 mounts, with two positioned forward and two aft; and two M60 7.62 mm/30 caliber machine guns, both mounted amidships. The ship can carry 4,000 rounds of 12.7 mm and 2,000 rounds of 7.62 mm ammunition. A large "Big Eyes" binocular is also carried on tripod mounts, one on the forecastle and one just abaft the mast.

Propulsion

Operational history 
In July 2018, the BRP Felix Apolinario participated in the second leg of the 4th Combined Maritime Security Activity (MSA) with the Royal Australian Navy (RAN) in the waters around Tawi-Tawi along with the  Patrol Craft and Multi-Purpose Attack Craft (MPAC) Mk 1 (BA-482).

Footnotes

References

External links
 Philippine Navy Official website
 Philippine Fleet Official Website
 Philippine Defense Forum

1990s ships
Ships of the Philippine Navy